Paraborsonia is a genus of sea snails, marine gastropod mollusks in the family Borsoniidae.

Species
Species within the genus Paraborsonia include:
 Paraborsonia lindae Petuch, 1987
 † Paraborsonia varicosa (G. B. Sowerby I, 1850)

References

External links
 Pilsbry, H. A. (1922). Revision of W. M. Gabb's Tertiary Mollusca of Santo Domingo. Proceedings of the Academy of Natural Sciences of Philadelphia. 73(2): 305-435, pls 16-47
  Bouchet P., Kantor Yu.I., Sysoev A. & Puillandre N. (2011) A new operational classification of the Conoidea. Journal of Molluscan Studies 77: 273-308.